In mathematics, especially several complex variables, an analytic polyhedron is a subset of the complex space  of the form

Every analytic polyhedron is a domain of holomorphy and it is thus pseudo-convex.

The boundary of an analytic polyhedron is contained in the union of the set of hypersurfaces

 

See also
Behnke–Stein theorem
Bergman–Weil formula
Oka–Weil theorem

Notes

References
.
 (also available as ).
.
.
.
.
. Notes from a course held by Francesco Severi at the Istituto Nazionale di Alta Matematica (which at present bears his name), containing appendices of Enzo Martinelli, Giovanni Battista Rizza and Mario Benedicty. An English translation of the title reads as:-"Lectures on analytic functions of several complex variables – Lectured in 1956–57 at the Istituto Nazionale di Alta Matematica in Rome".

Several complex variables